Liliane Pierre-Paul (born 16 June 1953) is a prominent journalist, activist, radio broadcaster, and radio station founder in Haiti. She broadcasts in Haitian Creole, which she describes as the people's language. Pierre-Paul received a Courage in Journalism Award in 1990 from the International Women's Media Foundation. She also received le prix Roc Cadet de SOS Liberte in 2014. Musician and former president of Haiti Michel Martelly sang a carnival méringue song entitled "Bal Bannan nan" (Give Her the Banana), mocking Paul. She appears in the film Moloch Tropical. Her husband Anthony Barbier was appointed general secretary of the National Palace by Provisional President Jocelerme Privert.

References

External links 
Profile of Liliane Pierre Paul l on France Culture (French language).
https://www.dictionnaire-creatrices.com/fiche-liliane-pierre-paul

1953 births
Living people
Radio reporters and correspondents
Haitian journalists